Free State is one of the nine multi-member constituencies of the National Assembly of South Africa, the lower house of the Parliament of South Africa, the national legislature of South Africa. The constituency was established as Orange Free State in 1994 when the National Assembly was established by the Interim Constitution following the end of Apartheid. It was renamed Free State in 1999. It is conterminous with the province of Free State. The constituency currently elects 11 of the 400 members of the National Assembly using the closed party-list proportional representation electoral system. At the 2019 general election it had 1,462,508 registered electors.

Electoral system
Free State currently elects 11 of the 400 members of the National Assembly using the closed party-list proportional representation electoral system. Constituency seats are allocated using the largest remainder method with a Droop quota.

Election results

Summary

Detailed

2019
Results of the 2019 general election held on 8 May 2019:

The following candidates were elected:
Dikeledi Direko (ANC), Werner Horn (DA), Thanduxolo Khalipha (ANC), Nomsa Kubheka (ANC), Annelie Lotriet (DA), Dibolelo Mahlatsi (ANC), Lawrence McDonald (ANC), Hlengiwe Mkhaliphi (EFF), Madala Ntombela (ANC), Xolisile Qayiso (ANC) and Bheki Radebe (ANC).

2014
Results of the 2014 general election held on 7 May 2014:

The following candidates were elected:
Nomsa Marchesi (DA), Lefu Peter Khoarai (ANC), Nthabiseng Pauline Khunou (ANC), Kgotso Zachariah Morapela (EFF), Madala Louis David Ntombela (ANC), Bhekizizwe Abram Radebe (ANC), Tete Ramalie Jonas Ezekiel Ramokhoase (ANC), David Christie Ross (DA), Maureen Angela Scheepers (ANC), Maggie Sotyu (ANC) and Sibongile Pearm Tsoleli (ANC).

2009
Results of the 2009 general election held on 22 April 2009:

The following candidates were elected:
Salam Abram (ANC), Faith Claudine Bikani (ANC), Diratsagae Alfred Kganare (COPE), Lefu Peter Khoarai (ANC), Nthabiseng Pauline Khunou (ANC), Butana Moses Komphela (ANC), Patricia Kopane (DA), Kgomotso Ruth Magau (ANC), Bhekizizwe Abram Radebe (ANC), Jacobus Schmidt (DA), Maggie Sotyu (ANC) and Manana Florence Tlake (ANC).

2004
Results of the 2004 general election held on 14 April 2004:

The following candidates were elected:
Salam Abram (ANC), Andries Johannes Botha (DA), Nthabiseng Pauline Khunou (ANC), Butana Moses Komphela (ANC), Meisie Maureen Madumise (ANC), Kgomotso Ruth Magau (ANC), Neo Harrison Masithela (ANC), Bafunani Aaron Mnguni (ANC), Lewele John Modisenyane (ANC), Bahlakoana Godfrey Mosala (ANC), Sisi Ntombela (ANC), Bhekizizwe Abram Radebe (ANC) and Maggie Sotyu (ANC).

1999
Results of the 1999 general election held on 2 June 1999:

1994
Results of the 1994 general election held on between 26 and 29 April 1994:

References

National Assembly constituency
National Assembly of South Africa constituencies
National Assembly of South Africa constituencies established in 1994